Merdare is a village located in the municipality of Kuršumlija, Serbia. According to the 2011 census, the village has a population of 151 people. The administrative crossing between Serbia and Kosovo is located in Merdare.

References

Populated places in Toplica District
Kosovo–Serbia border crossings